The 3rd (Prince of Wales's) Dragoon Guards was a cavalry regiment in the British Army, first raised in 1685 as the Earl of Plymouth's Regiment of Horse.  It was renamed as the 3rd Regiment of Dragoon Guards in 1751 and the 3rd (Prince of Wales's) Dragoon Guards in 1765. It saw service for two centuries, including the First World War, before being amalgamated into the 3rd/6th Dragoon Guards in 1922.

History

The regiment was first raised by Thomas Hickman-Windsor, 1st Earl of Plymouth as the Earl of Plymouth's Regiment of Horse in 1685 as part of the response to the Monmouth Rebellion, by the regimenting of various independent troops, and was ranked as the 4th Regiment of Horse. The regiment saw action at the Battle of Schellenberg in July 1704, the Battle of Blenheim in August 1704, the Battle of Ramillies in May 1706, the Battle of Oudenarde in July 1708 and the Battle of Malplaquet in September 1709 during the War of the Spanish Succession. In 1746 it was ranked as the 3rd Dragoon Guards, and formally titled in 1751 as the 3rd Regiment of Dragoon Guards.

Shortly thereafter, in 1765, it took the title 3rd (Prince of Wales's) Dragoon Guards, for the future George IV. It took part in the suppression of the Bristol riots in 1831 and, after service in India, took part in the British Expedition to Abyssinia in 1868. The regiment was employed chasing the elusive General Christiaan de Wet in spring 1901 during the Second Boer War.

The regiment, which was in Cairo at the start of First World War, landed in France as part of the 6th Cavalry Brigade in the 3rd Cavalry Division in October 1914 for service on the Western Front where it fought at the First Battle of Ypres in October 1914, the Second Battle of Ypres in April 1915 and the Battle of Cambrai in November 1917.

It retitled as 3rd Dragoon Guards (Prince of Wales's) in 1921, and was amalgamated with the 6th Dragoon Guards (Carabiniers) to form the 3rd/6th Dragoon Guards the following year.

Regimental museum
The regimental collection is held in the Cheshire Military Museum at Chester Castle. Some items are also held by the Royal Scots Dragoon Guards Museum at Edinburgh Castle.

Battle honours
The regiment was awarded the following battle honours:

Early Wars: Blenheim, Ramillies, Oudenarde, Malplaquet, Warburg, Beaumont, Willems, Talavera, Albuhera, Vittoria, Peninsula, Abyssinia, South Africa 1901–02.
The Great War: Ypres 1914, 1915, Nonne Bosschen, Frezenberg, Loos, Arras 1917, Scarpe 1917, Somme 1918, St. Quentin, Avre, Amiens, Hindenburg Line, Beaurevoir, Cambrai 1918, Pursuit to Mons, France and Flanders 1914–18.

Commanding Officers

The Commanding Officers have been:
1958–1960: Lt.-Col. J. M. Ashton
1960–1962: Lt.-Col. George P. Badham
1962–1965: Lt.-Col. Edward I. Stanford
1965–1967: Lt.-Col. William R. B. Allen
1967–1970: Lt.-Col. Henry S. L. Dalzell-Payne
1970–1971: Lt.-Col. Anthony J. Bateman

Colonels
The colonels of the regiment were as follows:

1685 4th Regiment of Horse

 1685 Thomas, Earl of Plymouth —Windsor's or The Earl of Plymouth's Regiment of Horse
 1687 Sir John Fenwick —Sir John Fenwick's Horse
 1688 Richard, Earl Rivers —Savage's or Earl Rivers' Horse
 1693 John, Lord Berkeley —Lord Berkeley's Horse
 1693 Cornelius Wood —Wood's Horse 
 1712 Thomas, Viscount Windsor —Lord Windsor's Horse
 1717 George Wade —Wade's Horse

1746 3rd Regiment of Horse
 1748 Sir Charles Howard K B —Sir Charles Howard's Horse

1751 3rd Regiment of Dragoon Guards
 1751 Sir Charles Howard

1765 3rd (Prince of Wales's) Dragoon Guards
 1765 Gen. Lord Robert Manners
 1782 Gen. Philip Honywood
 1785 Lt-Gen. Richard Burton Phillipson 
 1792 Gen. Sir William Fawcett
 1804 Gen. Richard Vyse
 1825 Gen. Sir William Payne-Gallwey, 1st Baronet
 1831 Gen. Samuel Hawker
 1839 Lt-Gen. Sir James Charles Dalbiac
 1842 Lt-Gen. Francis Newbery
 1847 Gen. Charles Cathcart, 2nd Earl Cathcart
 1851 Lt-Gen. James Claud Bourchier
 1859 Gen. Sir John Scott
 1866 Gen. Robert Richardson Robertson
 1883 Gen. Sir William Henry Seymour
 1891 Lt-Gen. Conyers Tower
 1903 Maj-Gen. Andrew Smythe Montague Browne
 1905 Maj-Gen. George Salis-Schwabe
 1907 Maj-Gen. Sir Reginald Talbot
 1920 Maj-Gen. Sir Nevill Maskelyne Smyth

1921 3rd Dragoon Guards (Prince of Wales's)

 1922: regiment amalgamated with the 6th Dragoon Guards (Carabiniers) to form the 3rd/6th Dragoon Guards

See also
British cavalry during the First World War

References

Sources 

Cavalry regiments of the British Army
Dragoon Guards
1685 establishments in England
Military units and formations disestablished in 1922
DG3
Military units and formations established in 1685